

Seeds
Champion seeds are indicated in bold text while text in italics indicates the round in which those seeds were eliminated. All eight seeded teams received byes to the second round.

Draw

Finals

Top half

Bottom half

External links
 1990 Paris Open Doubles draw

Doubles